The Tipstaff is an officer of a court or, in some countries, a law clerk to a judge. The duties of the position vary from country to country. It is also the name of a symbolic rod, which represents the authority of the tipstaff or other officials such as senior police officers.

History

The office of the Tipstaff is thought to have been created in the 14th century.  One of the earliest records of the Tipstaff was mentioned in 1570: "The Knight Marshall with all hys tippe staves".  It is a position of both law enforcement and ceremonial duties.

An earlier mention of tipstaff is in 1555 when the Rev'd Rowland Taylor was burned at the stake during the reign of Queen Mary I for his religious views that were contrary to those of Lord Chancellor Gardiner. Foxe's Book of Martyrs states that Taylor would have spoken to the people but as soon as he opened his mouth the yeoman of the guard thrust a tipstaff into his mouth, and would in no way permit him to speak. This is also quoted in Five English Reformers by J. C. Ryle.

The name originates from the early law enforcement officers who would arrest by beating them with a tipped staff or stave.  The staff was made of wood or metal or both, topped with a crown.  The crown, which unscrewed, could be removed to reveal inside the hollow staff a warrant appointing the holder to their position of authority.  Some staffs were definitely a means of protection and this is where the present day policeman's baton, or truncheon, originates.

Examples remain at the Royal Courts of Justice and the Metropolitan Police Heritage Centre in London and vary depending on the type and rank of officer. These tipstaves were first carried in the late 18th and early 19th centuries. When detectives (in plain clothes) were first authorised, the tipstaves issued to plainclothes officers from 1867 were re-issued in 1870 engraved "Metropolitan Police officer in plain clothes".

The staff kept at the Royal Courts of Justice is now only used on ceremonial occasions.  It is 12 inches in length and made of ebony decorated with a silver crown and three bands of silver engraved with the Royal Arms at the top. Around the middle is inscribed "AMOS HAWKINS, TIPSTAFF COURTS OF CHANCERY" and around the bottom is inscribed "Appointed 14th January, 1884, by the Rt. Hon. The Earl of Selborne, L.C." with another coat of Royal Arms.  The date was that on which this staff was first used, soon after the Law Courts were opened.  Prior to 1884, each Tipstaff had their own staff, which they retained when they retired.

As a symbol
The emblem of two crossed tipstaves (tipstaffs) within a wreath appears on the rank insignia of senior police officers in several Commonwealth countries, including the United Kingdom and Australia. In Canada, the emblem is used for the most senior officers of the Ontario Provincial Police and Royal Newfoundland Constabulary.

Current usage

Australia

In Australia, a tipstaff is roughly equivalent to a law clerk in the United States. The term is used principally in the Supreme Court of New South Wales and in the County Court of Victoria

United Kingdom

England and Wales
There are currently two Tipstaffs in England and Wales: one is an officer of the Royal Borough of Kingston and the other an officer of the High Court of England and Wales, appointed under section 27 of the Courts Act 1971. It is the latter to which this section refers.

The High Court Tipstaff may appoint three assistants and can call on any constable, bailiff or member of the public to assist in carrying out their duties. Their jurisdiction extends throughout England and Wales. They are authorised to force entry if necessary, and will have a police officer present to prevent breach of the peace. The relevant territorial police force is informed of arrests.

Sometimes a local bailiff or police will detain a person in custody until the Tipstaff arrives to collect them and take them to court or prison. Pentonville Prison (for civil offenders) is obliged to take into custody‚ no matter what the circumstances‚ anybody taken there by the Tipstaff. Tipstaff may make the same demands of the custody suite within the Royal Courts of Justice itself, and they are obliged to take into custody any individual he brings there.

The Tipstaff heads a procession of the Lord Chancellor and judges at the start of the legal year‚ preceding them with their staff as a symbol of authority and law enforcement. They also lead the Lord Mayor from their golden coach to the Lord Chief Justice's Court for the "swearing in" of the Lord Mayor‚ afterwards attending the Lord Mayor's Banquet, having led the Lord Chancellor into the Guildhall. The black uniform‚ only worn on ceremonial occasions‚ is based on that of a Victorian police inspector. They wear a black hat with gold braid trimmings and jacket with silver buttons‚ a wing collar with a white bow tie and white gloves. The Tipstaff is the only person authorised to make an arrest within the precincts of the Royal Courts of Justice.

Every applicable order made in the High Court is addressed to the Tipstaff: "I hereby command you the Tipstaff and your assistants in Her Majesty's name to take and safely convey and deliver the said ... to the Governor of Her Majesty's Prison ..."(as in the case of making an arrest). The majority of their work involves taking children into custody (i.e. a place of safety)‚ including cases of child abduction abroad.

In child abduction cases, there may be a 'seek and locate' order backed by a bench warrant ordering any person with knowledge of the child to give that information to the Tipstaff or to their deputy or assistants. Related orders may require the alleged abductor to hand their passport and other travel documents to the Tipstaff, and order the Tipstaff to take the child and deliver them to a designated place. There may also be a 'port alert' executed by the Tipstaff, to help prevent the child being taken abroad.

In the case of children who have been declared a ward of court i.e. where the court is acting in loco parentis, the Tipstaff has a role in ensuring that those children are delivered to the locations specified by the court.

Northern Ireland
Tipstaffs and Court Criers in Northern Ireland have no enforcement role, but act as personal assistants to High Court and County Court judges.

United States
In some states of the United States, the Tipstaff is called a Tipstave and is responsible for courtroom decorum. Their position is similar to that of a bailiff. The Civil Division of the Municipal Court of Philadelphia employs Tipstaves as clerks to the court. The Criminal Trial Division employs Tipstaves in positions commonly referred to as Court officers.

See also
Bailiff
Sheriff
Marshal
Police

References

External links
Royal Courts of Justice visitors guide

Law enforcement occupations in the United Kingdom
Law enforcement occupations
Historical legal occupations
Law clerks
English law
Law of Northern Ireland
Law of the United States